Ismael Mousa Dahqani (Arabic:إسماعيل موسى دهقاني) (born 9 July 1991) is a Qatari footballer who plays for Umm Salal as a right back.

External links

References

Qatari footballers
1991 births
Living people
Umm Salal SC players
Qatar Stars League players
Association football fullbacks